Cornelius O'Brien may refer to:

Cornelius O'Brien (piper) (fl. 1656), Irish musician
Cornelius O'Brien (bishop) (1843–1906), Canadian Roman Catholic priest, archbishop, and author
Cornelius O'Brien (County Clare) (1782–1857), politician and builder of O'Brien's tower
Cornelius J. O'Brien (1869–1954), vaudeville and minstrel show performer